Jagged-2 is a protein that in humans is encoded by the JAG2 gene.

Function 

The Notch signaling pathway is an intercellular signaling mechanism that is essential for proper embryonic development. Members of the Notch gene family encode transmembrane receptors that are critical for various cell fate decisions. The protein encoded by this gene is one of several ligands that activate Notch and related receptors. Two transcript variants encoding different isoforms have been found for this gene.

Interactions 

JAG2 has been shown to interact with NOTCH2.

MicroRNA miR-1280 has been shown to inhibit JAG2 expression.

References

Further reading